Kenia Vanessa Lechuga Alanís (born 26 June 1994) is a Mexican competitive rower.

She competed at the 2016 Summer Olympics in Rio de Janeiro, in the women's single sculls, where she placed 12th. She won a gold medal in lightweight single sculls at the 2019 Pan American Games.

References

External links

1994 births
Living people
Mexican female rowers
Olympic rowers of Mexico
Rowers at the 2015 Pan American Games
Rowers at the 2016 Summer Olympics
Rowers at the 2019 Pan American Games
Rowers at the 2020 Summer Olympics
Pan American Games medalists in rowing
Pan American Games gold medalists for Mexico
Medalists at the 2019 Pan American Games
Sportspeople from Nuevo León
21st-century Mexican women